Camila Silva Espinoza (born 30 October 1992) is a Chilean former tennis player.

She won six singles titles and 13 doubles titles on the ITF Circuit. On 2 May 2011, she reached her best singles ranking of world No. 410. On 1 April 2013, she peaked at No. 422 in the doubles rankings.

Playing for Chile Fed Cup team, Silva has a win–loss record of 7–9.

ITF finals

Singles: 9 (6–3)

Doubles: 20 (13–7)

References

External links
 
 
 

1992 births
Living people
Sportspeople from Valparaíso
Chilean female tennis players
Tennis players at the 2011 Pan American Games
Pan American Games competitors for Chile
South American Games silver medalists for Chile
South American Games medalists in tennis
Competitors at the 2014 South American Games
21st-century Chilean women